Schaub's myotis (Myotis schaubi) is a species of vesper bat. It is found in Armenia, Azerbaijan and Iran and known from fossils from Hungary. It is related to Myotis nattereri.

References

Simmons, N.B. 2005. Order Chiroptera. Pp. 312–529 in Wilson, D.E. and Reeder, D.M. (eds.). Mammal Species of the World: A Taxonomic and Geographic Reference. 3rd ed. Baltimore: The Johns Hopkins University Press, 2 vols., 2142 pp. 

Mouse-eared bats
Mammals of the Middle East
Mammals of Azerbaijan
Mammals of Europe
Mammals described in 1934
Taxonomy articles created by Polbot
Bats of Asia